38th Regiment or 38th Infantry Regiment may refer to:

Infantry regiments
 38th Dogras, a unit of the British Indian Army
 38th (1st Staffordshire) Regiment of Foot, a unit of the British Army
 38th Infantry Regiment (United States), a unit of the United States Army

Cavalry regiments
 38th Regiment Central India Horse, a unit of the British Indian Army
 38th Cavalry Regiment, a unit of the United States Army

American Civil War regiments
 38th Illinois Infantry Regiment, a unit of the Union (Northern) Army
 38th Indiana Infantry Regiment, a unit of the Union (Northern) Army
 38th Iowa Infantry Regiment, a unit of the Union (Northern) Army
 38th Massachusetts Infantry Regiment, a unit of the Union (Northern) Army
 38th Ohio Infantry Regiment, a unit of the Union (Northern) Army
 38th Wisconsin Infantry Regiment, a unit of the Union (Northern) Army
 38th United States Colored Infantry Regiment, a unit of the Union (Northern) Army
 38th Alabama Infantry Regiment, a unit of the Confederate (Southern) Army
 38th Tennessee Infantry Regiment, a unit of the Confederate (Southern) Army
 38th Virginia Infantry, a unit of the Confederate (Southern) Army

Other regiments
 38 (City of Sheffield) Signal Regiment, a unit of the British Army
 38th Field Artillery Regiment, a unit of the United States Army
 38th Field Regiment, a unit of the New Zealand Army

See also
 38th Division (disambiguation)
 38th Brigade (disambiguation)
 38 Squadron (disambiguation)
 38th Wing (disambiguation)